Grabonoški Vrh is a settlement in the Municipality of Cerkvenjak in northeastern Slovenia. It lies in the Slovene Hills east of Cerkvenjak. The area is part of the traditional region of Styria and is now included in the Drava Statistical Region.

Two of originally six Roman period burial mounds are still preserved in a nearby forest. Artefacts from the four destroyed in 1954 are kept in the regional museum in Maribor.

References

External links
Grabonoški Vrh on Geopedia

Populated places in the Municipality of Cerkvenjak